The 2003 Cupa României Final was the 65th final of Romania's most prestigious cup competition. The final was played at the Stadionul Naţional in Bucharest on 31 May 2003 and was contested between Divizia A sides Dinamo București and Naţional București. The cup was won by Dinamo.

Route to the final

Match details

References

External links
 Official site 

Cupa Romaniei Final, 2003
2002-03
FC Dinamo București matches
May 2003 sports events in Europe